Juliet Gardiner (born 24 June 1943) is a British historian and a commentator on British social history from Victorian times through to the 1950s. She is a former editor of History Today magazine, a Research Fellow at the Institute of Historical Research of the School of Advanced Study at the University of London, an Honorary Fellow at the Institute for Advanced Studies in the Humanities and at the University of Edinburgh.  She has taught at Middlesex University and Oxford Brookes University. Gardiner has also worked as a publisher for Weidenfeld & Nicolson. Since 2001 she has been a full-time writer.

Early years
In her autobiography Gardiner writes that she was born as "Olivia" to an unmarried mother from Italy. At the age of two she was adopted by a Hemel Hempstead sanitary inspector called Charles Wells and his wife Dolly. Her new parents renamed her "Gillian".

Work
Her books include Wartime: Britain 1939-1945 (Headline, 2004) which recounts the history of the Home Front during World War II. Gardiner also wrote the books to accompany the Channel 4 television series The 1940s House (2000) and The Edwardian Country House (2002), and three books linked to exhibitions at London's Imperial War Museum, From the Bomb to the Beatles (1999), The Children's War: The Second World War Through the Eyes of the Children of Britain (2005) and The Animals' War: Animals in Wartime from the First World War to the Present Day (2006). Gardiner was also the editor of Who's Who in British History (2000, Collins & Brown), the "History Today" Companion to British History (1996, Collins & Brown) with Neil Wenborn and The Penguin Dictionary of British History (2000). She acted as historical consultant to the film of Atonement, and is a frequent broadcaster on radio and television, a reviewer and a contributor to the national press, including The Sunday Times, Sunday Telegraph, Financial Times, The Guardian and BBC History.

Gardiner's book on 1930s Britain, The Thirties: An Intimate History, was published by HarperCollins in 2009. Its purpose was, as Gardiner herself has explained, to take the structure of the 1930s, formed over the years by political and economic historians, and "fill in as many details as possible" about how people lived their lives during that period.

Gardiner's most recent book:; The Blitz: The British Under Attack was published in 2010 by Harper Press.

In 2012, Gardiner wrote and presented a series for BBC Radio 4 entitled The History of the Future a series of ten programmes exploring how cultures of the past viewed the possibilities of the future.

Personal
On 18 February 1961, she married George Gardiner, a British Conservative Party politician and journalist.   During the next couple of years she stopped being "Gillian" and became "Juliet".   She would later describe being married to a Conservative politician as being "like a vicar's wife who doesn't believe in God".   There were three recorded children, but in 1980 the marriage ended in divorce.

References

External links
 Official website
Juliet Gardiner at Gresham College
A walk through wartime London

1943 births
Living people
British historians
British women historians
History Today people